Ferdinand Janotka (born 17 October 1945) is a former international Austrian football player and manager.

His last job was working as the director of football of First Vienna.

External links 

 

Austrian footballers
FK Austria Wien players
Austrian Football Bundesliga players
Austrian football managers
FK Austria Wien managers
Footballers from Vienna
1945 births
Living people
Association football defenders